John Graham Haggart,  (November 14, 1836 – March 13, 1913) was a Canadian politician.

Haggart served as a Member of Parliament from 1872 to 1913. This forty-year period of service in the Commons is the second-longest in Canadian history, exceeded only by Wilfrid Laurier, whose period of service (1874-1919) mostly overlaps with Haggart's.  He was appointed as Postmaster General, serving in the cabinets of John A. Macdonald and John Abbott until 1892, when he switched portfolios, serving as Minister of Railways and Canals until the defeat of the Conservative government in 1896.

Prior to being elected to the House of Commons, Haggart was elected Mayor of Perth, Ontario three times: in 1867, 1869 and 1871.

There is a John Haggart fonds at Library and Archives Canada.

References

External links 
 
 

1836 births
1913 deaths
Canadian Ministers of Railways and Canals
Canadian Presbyterians
Conservative Party of Canada (1867–1942) MPs
Mayors of places in Ontario
Members of the House of Commons of Canada from Ontario
Members of the King's Privy Council for Canada